The 2015–16 Cal State Fullerton Titans men's basketball team represented California State University, Fullerton during the 2015–16 NCAA Division I men's basketball season. The Titans, led by third year head coach Dedrique Taylor, played their home games at Titan Gym as members of the Big West Conference. They finished the season 10–20, 3–13 in Big West play to finish in last place. They lost in the quarterfinals of the Big West tournament to Hawaii.

Roster

Schedule and results
Source: 

|-
!colspan=9 style="background:#F69F1E; color:#003768;"| Exhibition

|-
!colspan=9 style="background:#F69F1E; color:#003768;"| Regular season

|-
!colspan=9 style="background:#F69F1E; color:#003768;"| Big West tournament

References

Cal State Fullerton Titans men's basketball seasons
Cal State Fullerton
Fullerton Titans
Fullerton Titans